Ken Stimpson Community School is a co-educational secondary school and sixth form located in Peterborough in the English county of Cambridgeshire. The school is a Business & Enterprise specialist school.

History
Ken Stimpson Community School was founded in 1982, it was a tribute to Kenneth. W. Stimpson who was the Senior Area Education Officer between 1974 and 1979. In 2019, the school moved from a polo shirt focused uniform to one with a tie, shirt and blazer.

Expansion 
In September 2018, the local council approved plans for the school to build a new two storey teaching block and to expand some of the existing structures to accommodate a planned rise in capacity from 1014 pupils to 1650 pupils.

Community
At Ken Stimpson Community School they have a wide range of activities and services that are available to the community such as a sports centre (which has a Gym and a sports hall) and the school is home to the Werrington Library. The school has advertisements outside the local Tesco store.

Subjects
The subject that are taught  at Ken Stimpson are:
Art
Business & Enterprise
Careers
Computing
Design And Technology
English
Humanities
Modern Foreign Languages
Mathematics
Physical Education
Performing Arts
Science

E-Safety Mark 
In June 2015, Ken Stimpson received the 360 Degree Safe E-Safety mark by the South West Grid for Learning and was the first school in Peterborough to get this certification. According to the Accreditation 360 Degree Safe website, this demonstrates that the school shows good practice in their e-safety policies and procedures.

Ofsted Inspection 
The school's latest Ofsted inspection result was Good.

References

Educational institutions established in 1982
Secondary schools in Peterborough
1982 establishments in England
Community schools in Peterborough